George Tsebelis is a Greek-American political scientist who specializes in comparative politics and formal modeling. He is currently Anatol Rapoport Collegiate Professor of Political Science at the University of Michigan.

He received undergraduate degrees in engineering from the National Technical University of Athens and in political science from Sciences Po. He received a doctorate in mathematical statistics from Pierre and Marie Curie University and one in political science from Washington University in St. Louis. Tsebelis was elected as a Fellow of the American Academy of Arts and Sciences as part of the Academy's 2016 class.

Veto players theory 
Tsebelis developed the theory of "veto players", set out in his best known work, Veto Players: How Political Institutions Work (2002).

See also 
 Agenda-setting theory

References

External links
 Veto Players: How Political Institutions Work at Princeton University Press
 Tsebelis' homepage

American people of Greek descent
American political scientists
Greek political scientists
Living people
University of Michigan faculty
Year of birth missing (living people)
Washington University in St. Louis alumni
Pierre and Marie Curie University alumni
National Technical University of Athens alumni
Sciences Po alumni